The canton of Lusignan is an administrative division of the Vienne department, western France. Its borders were modified at the French canton reorganisation which came into effect in March 2015. Its seat is in Lusignan.

It consists of the following communes:
 
Anché
Brux
Celle-Lévescault
Chaunay
Cloué
Coulombiers
Curzay-sur-Vonne
Jazeneuil
Lusignan
Romagne
Rouillé
Saint-Sauvant
Sanxay
Valence-en-Poitou
Voulon

References

Cantons of Vienne